Mark Švets (born 1 October 1976) is a retired Estonian international footballer.

Club career
In a much-travelled career, Švets has played for various clubs in Estonia, Russia, Kazakhstan and Belarus. He won the Kazakhstan Cup in 2003 with FC Kairat.

International career
He made 16 appearances and scored one goal for Estonia national football team between 1998 and 2001.

Career stats

Club

References

External links
Profile on Estonian Football Association homepage

1976 births
Living people
Estonian footballers
Estonia international footballers
Estonian expatriate footballers
Expatriate footballers in Russia
Expatriate footballers in Kazakhstan
Expatriate footballers in Belarus
Estonian expatriate sportspeople in Russia
Estonian expatriate sportspeople in Kazakhstan
Estonian expatriate sportspeople in Belarus
FC Flora players
FC Kuressaare players
Viljandi JK Tulevik players
FCI Levadia Tallinn players
FC Dynamo Saint Petersburg players
FC Ajax Lasnamäe players
FC Kairat players
PFC Spartak Nalchik players
FC Elista players
FC Petrotrest players
FC SKA-Khabarovsk players
FC Smorgon players
Estonian men's futsal players
Association football midfielders
FC Dynamo Makhachkala players
Meistriliiga players